Siouan or Siouan–Catawban is a language family of North America that is located primarily in the Great Plains, Ohio and Mississippi valleys and southeastern North America with a few other languages in the east.

Name
Authors who call the entire family Siouan distinguish the two branches as Western Siouan and Eastern Siouan or as Siouan-proper and Catawban. Others restrict the name "Siouan" to the western branch and use the name Siouan–Catawban for the entire family. Generally, however, the name "Siouan" is used without distinction.

Family division

Siouan languages can be grouped into the Western Siouan languages and Catawban languages. The Western Siouan languages can be divided into Missouri River languages (such as Crow and Hidatsa), Mandan, Mississippi River languages (such as Dakotan, Chiwere-Winnebago, and Dhegihan languages), and Ohio Valley Siouan branches. The Catawban languages consist only of Catawban and Woccon.

Proto-Siouan

Previous proposals
There is a certain amount of comparative work in Siouan–Catawban languages. Wolff (1950–51) is among the first and more complete works on the subject. Wolff reconstructed the system of proto-Siouan, and this was modified by Matthews (1958). The latter's system is shown below:

With respect to vowels, five oral vowels are being reconstructed  and three nasal vowels . Wolff also reconstructed some consonantal clusters .

Current proposal
Collaborative work involving a number of Siouanists started at the 1984 Comparative Siouan Workshop at the University of Colorado with the goal of creating a comparative Siouan dictionary that would include Proto-Siouan reconstructions. This work yielded a different analysis of the phonemic system of Proto-Siouan, which appears below:

Consonants

In Siouanist literature (e.g., Rankin et al. 2015), Americanist phonetic transcriptions are the norm, so IPA * is Americanist *š, IPA *j is Americanist *y, and so on.

The major change to the previously-proposed system was accomplished by systematically accounting for the distribution of multiple stop series in modern Siouan languages by tracing them back to multiple stop series in the proto-language. Previous analysis posited only a single stop series.

Many of the consonant clusters proposed by Wolff (19501951) can be accounted for due to syncopation of short vowels before stressed syllables. For example, Matthews (1958: 129) gives *wróke as the proto-form for 'male.' With added data from a larger set of Siouan languages since the middle of the twentieth century, Rankin et al. (2015) give *waroː(-ka) as the reconstructed form for 'male.'

Unlike Wolff and Matthew's proposals, there are no posited nasal consonants in Proto-Siouan. Nasal consonants only arise in daughter languages when followed by a nasal vowel. 
In addition, there is a set of sounds that represent obstruentized versions of their corresponding sonorants. These sounds have different reflexes in daughter languages, with *w appearing as [w] or [m] in most daughter languages, while *W has a reflex of [w], [b], [mb], or [p]. The actual phonetic value of these obstruents is an issue of some debate, with some arguing that they arise through geminated *w+*w or *r+*r sequences or a laryngeal plus *w or *r.

Vowels
Previous work on Proto-Siouan only posited single vowel length. However, phonemic vowel length exists in several Siouan languages such as Hidatsa, Ho-Chunk, and Tutelo. Rankin et al. (2015) analyze numerous instances of long vowels as present due to common inheritance rather than common innovation. The five oral vowels and three nasal vowels posited by earlier scholars is expanded to include a distinction between short and long vowels. The proposed Proto-Siouan vowel system appears below:

Oral vowels

Nasal vowels

External relations
The Yuchi isolate may be the closest relative of Sioux–Catawban, based on both sound changes and morphological comparison.

In the 19th century, Robert Latham suggested that the Siouan languages are related to the Caddoan and Iroquoian languages. In 1931, Louis Allen presented the first list of systematic correspondences between a set of 25 lexical items in Siouan and Iroquoian. In the 1960s and 1970s, Wallace Chafe further explored the link between Siouan and Caddoan languages. In the 1990s, Marianne Mithun compared the morphology and syntax of all the three families.  At present, this Macro-Siouan hypothesis is not considered proven, and the similarities between the three families may instead be due to their protolanguages having been part of a sprachbund.

References

Bibliography
 Parks, Douglas R.; & Rankin, Robert L. (2001). "The Siouan languages." In R. J. DeMallie (Ed.), Handbook of North American Indians: Plains (Vol. 13, Part 1, pp. 94–114). W. C. Sturtevant (Gen. Ed.). Washington, D.C.: Smithsonian Institution. .

Further reading

External links

Comparative Siouan Dictionary
Siouan languages mailing list archive

 
Language families
Indigenous languages of the North American Plains
Sioux culture
Indigenous languages of Maryland